Moonage Daydream – A Brett Morgen Film is the soundtrack to the 2022 documentary film Moonage Daydream based on the life of English singer-songwriter David Bowie. It was released digitally on 16 September 2022 by Rhino Entertainment and Parlophone Records, followed by a two-disc CD release on 18 November 2022, with a three-disc vinyl edition set for later release in 2023.

Background 
The album was announced on 25 August 2022, to accompany the film, that contained previously unreleased live singles, tracks cut from the album, film-specific remixes of Bowie's tracks, orchestral performances and interview excerpts and monologues from Bowie himself. A single from the album  the remixed version of the song "Modern Love"  released on the same date. Bowie's official website, stated it as "This version is a unique mix starting with the isolated piano motif from the track, building up into the chorus before ending on the a cappella backing vocals offering an insight into the individual elements that create the classic we all know and love". The film-specific remix of the song "D.J." was released as the second single on 9 September 2022.

Brett Morgan worked for nearly 18 months to design the accompanying soundtrack, with the sound design team — re-recording mixers Paul Massey and David Giammarco, sound and music editor John Warhurst, supervising sound editor Nina Hartstone — working with him. On designing the film's music, Massey mashed up "a lot of music that wasn’t designed to go together into some amazing pieces of work. And the sound design is fully integrated into that. The soundtrack is like a huge dissolve, from the very beginning of the film until the end."

Reception 
At the Cannes Film Festival premiere on May 2022, Carey Matthew of Deadline Hollywood called it as "thundering soundtrack that literally shakes the seats". Kenji Fujishima of Slant Magazine wrote "Though Bowie’s music dominates the soundtrack (with his songs remixed for maximum heart-thumping arena-rock impact), the documentary also includes music inspired by the man’s art, including snippets from the Philip Glass symphonies based on Bowie’s Low and Heroes albums." Max Bell of Classic Rock wrote "If it’s axiomatic that great artistic careers build to a form of crescendo then this double CD, the official soundtrack to Brett Morgen's anticipated documentary on the musical odyssey of David Bowie, meets that criterion. Morgen’s work on Crossfire Hurricane, for the Rolling Stones, and Kurt Cobain: Montage Of Heck, persuaded Bowie’s estate to give him carte blanche on over fifty years of material, utilising sonic enhancement, mixes that veer from the sublime to the ridiculously sublime, and a spoken word narrative of sorts that threads the meaning of time, death and faith." The album received a nomination for Best Soundtrack at the St. Louis Gateway Film Critics Association Awards 2022.

Track listing

Personnel 
Credits adapted from CD liner notes.
 Tony Visconti – producer
 John Warhurst, Nina Hartstone – supervising sound engineers
 Bill Stein – re-recording engineer
 Jannek Zechner – mixing engineer
 Brett Morgen – musical mashups design and edit

Charts

Release history

References 

David Bowie soundtracks
David Bowie tribute albums
2022 soundtrack albums
Rhino Entertainment soundtracks
Parlophone soundtracks
Albums produced by Tony Visconti